Michael Aung-Thwin (1946 – August 14, 2021) was a Burmese American historian and emeritus professor at the University of Hawaiʻi at Mānoa, specializing in early Southeast Asian and Burmese history.

Early life and education 
Aung-Thwin was born in Rangoon, Burma (now Yangon, Myanmar) in 1946. Aung-Thwin's mother, Margaret Hope Aung-Thwin, of mixed Anglo-Burmese, Karen, and Arakanese descent, was a Fulbright scholar and lecturer. He attended Kodaikanal International School in South India, where his mother taught. He earned a bachelor of arts degree at Doane College in 1969, followed by a master of arts degree at University of Illinois Urbana-Champaign in 1971, and a PhD at the University of Michigan.

Academic career 
Aung-Thwin held academic posts at Elmira College, Kyoto University, Northern Illinois University, the National University of Singapore (NUS), and the University of Hawaii-Manoa. He served as the Director of the Center for Southeast Asian Studies, Northern Illinois University. In 2018, he was awarded the George E. Bogaars endowed professorship at NUS.

Death 
Aung-Thwin died at his home in Hawaii on August 14, 2021, after a long illness.

Publications 

 Pagan: The Origins of Modern Burma (1985)
 The Mists of Ramanna: The Legend that was Lower Burma (2005)
 A History of Myanmar Since Ancient Times: Traditions and Transformations (2013)
 Myanmar in the Fifteenth Century: A Tale of Two Kingdoms (2017)

Personal life 

Aung-Thwin was married to Maria, and had two children, Maitrii and Amita. Maitrii Aung-Thwin is a Burmese American historian and professor at NUS.

References 

Burmese writers
Burmese emigrants to the United States
20th-century Burmese historians
21st-century Burmese historians
University of Michigan alumni
Doane University alumni
University of Illinois Urbana-Champaign alumni
University of Hawaiʻi faculty
People from Yangon
1946 births
2021 deaths
Historians of Southeast Asia
Burmese studies scholars